Parachuting, including also skydiving, is a method of transiting from a high point in the atmosphere to the surface of Earth with the aid of gravity, involving the control of speed during the descent using a parachute or parachutes.

For human skydiving, it may involve a phase of more or less free-falling (the skydiving segment) which is a period when the parachute has not yet been deployed and the body gradually accelerates to terminal velocity.

For cargo parachuting, the parachute descent may begin immediately, such as a parachute-airdrop in the lower atmosphere of Earth, or be significantly delayed, such as in a planetary atmosphere where an object is descending "under parachute" following atmospheric entry from space, and may begin only after the hypersonic entry phase and initial deceleration that occurs due to friction with the thin upper atmosphere.

History

Common uses 
Parachuting is performed as a recreational activity and a competitive sport, and is widely considered an extreme sport due to the risks involved. In 2018, there were 3.3 million jumps in the US. Modern militaries utilise parachuting for the deployment of airborne forces and supplies. Special operations forces commonly employ parachuting, especially free-fall parachuting, as a method of insertion. Occasionally, forest firefighters, known as "smokejumpers" in the United States, use parachuting as a means of rapidly inserting themselves near forest fires in especially remote or otherwise inaccessible areas.

Manually exiting an aircraft and parachuting to safety has been widely used by aviators (especially military aviators and aircrew) and passengers to escape an aircraft that could not otherwise land safely. While this method of escape is relatively rare in modern times, it was occasionally used in World War I by German military aviators, and utilized extensively throughout the air wars of World War II. In modern times, the most common means of escape from an aircraft in distress is via an ejection seat. Said system is usually operated by the pilot, aircrew member, or passenger by engaging an activation device manually. In most designs, this will lead to the seat being propelled out of and away from the aircraft, carrying the occupant with it, by means of either an explosive charge or a rocket propulsion system. Once clear of the aircraft, the ejection seat will deploy a parachute, although some older models entrusted this step to manual activation by the seat's occupant.

Safety

In the U.S. during the 1970s, the sport averaged 42.5 fatalities annually. In the 1980s, the average dropped to 34.1, and in the 1990s, the average decreased to 32.3 deaths per year. Between 2000 and 2009, the average dropped to 25.8 and over the eight years after 2009, the annual average declined to 22.4 fatalities (roughly 7.5 fatalities per one million jumps). In 2017, members of one organization, the United States Parachute Association (USPA) reported 2,585 skydiving injuries sufficiently severe to require resort to a medical care facility.

In the US and in most of the western world, skydivers are required to wear two parachutes. The reserve parachute must be periodically inspected and repacked (whether used or not) by a certified parachute rigger (in the US, an FAA certificated parachute rigger every 180 days). Many skydivers use an automatic activation device (AAD) that opens the reserve parachute at a predetermined altitude if it detects that the skydiver is still in free fall. Depending on the country, AADs are often mandatory for new jumpers, and/or required for all jumpers regardless of their experience level. Some skydivers wear a visual altimeter, and some use audible altimeters fitted to their helmets.

Unsafe maneuvers 
Injuries and fatalities occurring under a fully functional parachute usually happen because the skydiver performed unsafe maneuvers or made an error in judgement while flying their canopy, typically resulting in a high-speed impact with the ground or other hazards on the ground. One of the most common sources of injury is a low turn under a high-performance canopy and while swooping. Swooping is the advanced discipline of gliding at high-speed parallel to the ground during landing.

Winds 

Changing wind conditions are another risk factor. In conditions of strong winds and turbulence during hot days, the parachutist can be caught in downdrafts close to the ground. Shifting winds can cause a crosswind or downwind landing which have a higher potential for injury due to the wind speed adding to the landing speed.

Canopy collisions 
Another risk factor is that of "canopy collisions", or collisions between two or more skydivers under fully inflated parachutes. Canopy collisions can cause the jumpers' inflated parachutes to entangle with each other, often resulting in a sudden collapse (deflation) of one or more of the involved parachutes. When this occurs, the jumpers often must quickly perform emergency procedures (if there is sufficient altitude to do so) to "cut-away" (jettison) from their main canopies and deploy their reserve canopies. Canopy collisions are particularly dangerous when occurring at altitudes too low to allow the jumpers adequate time to safely jettison their main parachutes and fully deploy their reserve parachutes.

Equipment failure 
Equipment failure may contribute to fatalities and injuries. Approximately one in 750 deployments of a main parachute result in a malfunction. Ram-air parachutes typically spin uncontrollably when malfunctioning, and must be jettisoned before deploying the reserve parachute. Reserve parachutes are packed and deployed differently; they are also designed more conservatively and built and tested to more exacting standards so they are more reliable than main parachutes, but the real safety advantage comes from the probability of an unlikely main malfunction multiplied by the even less likely probability of a reserve malfunction. This yields an even smaller probability of a double malfunction although the possibility of a main malfunction that cannot be cut away causing a reserve malfunction is a very real risk. Static line failures pose risks of towed paratroopers.

Base jumping 
Parachuting disciplines such as BASE jumping or those that involve equipment such as wingsuit flying and sky surfing have a higher risk factor due to the lower mobility of the jumper and the greater risk of entanglement. For this reason, these disciplines are generally practised by experienced jumpers.
USPA member drop zones in the US and Canada are required to have an experienced jumper act as a "safety officer" (in Canada DSO – Drop Zone Safety Officer; in the U.S. S&TA – Safety and Training Advisor) who is responsible for dealing with jumpers who violate rules, regulations, or otherwise act in a fashion deemed unsafe by the appointed individual.

In many countries, either the local regulations or the liability-conscious prudence of the drop zone owners require that parachutists must have attained the age of majority before engaging in the sport.

The first skydive performed without a parachute was by stuntman Gary Connery on 23 May 2012 at 732 m.

Most common injuries
Due to the hazardous nature of skydiving, precautions are taken to avoid parachuting injuries and death. For first-time solo-parachutists, this includes anywhere from 4 to 8 hours of ground instruction. Since the majority of parachute injuries occur upon landing (approximately 85%), the greatest emphasis within ground training is usually on the proper parachute landing fall (PLF), which seeks to orient the body so as to evenly disperse the impact through flexion of several large, insulating muscles (such as the medial gastrocnemius, tibialis anterior, rectus femoris, vastus medialis, biceps femoris, and semitendinosus), as opposed to individual bones, tendons, and ligaments which break and tear more easily.

Parachutists, especially those flying smaller sport canopies, often land with dangerous amounts of kinetic energy, and for this reason, improper landings are the cause of more than 30% of all skydiving-related injuries and deaths. Often, injuries sustained during parachute landing are caused when a single outstretched limb, such as a hand or foot, is extended separately from the rest of the body, causing it to sustain forces disproportional to the support structures within. This tendency is displayed in the accompanying chart, which shows the significantly higher proportion of wrist and ankle injuries among the 186 injured in a 110,000 parachute jump study.

Due to the possibility of fractures (commonly occurring on the tibia and the ankle mortise), it is recommended that parachutists wear supportive footwear. Supportive footwear prevents inward and outward ankle rolling, allowing the PLF to safely transfer impact energy through the true ankle joint, and dissipate it via the medial gastrocnemius and tibialis anterior muscles.

Weather
Parachuting in poor weather, especially with thunderstorms, high winds, and dust devils can be a more dangerous activity. Reputable drop zones will suspend normal operations during inclement weather. In the United States, the USPA's Basic Safety Requirements prohibit solo student skydivers from jumping in winds exceeding 14 mph while using ram-air equipment. However, maximum ground winds are unlimited for licensed skydivers.

Visibility
As parachuting is an aviation activity under the visual flight rules, it is generally illegal to jump in or through clouds, according to the relevant rules governing the airspace, such as FAR105 in the US or Faldskærmsbestemmelser (Parachuting Ordinances) in Denmark. Jumpers and pilots of the dropping aircraft similarly bear responsibility of following the other VFR elements, in particular ensuring that the air traffic at the moment of jump does not create a hazard.

Canopy collisions
A collision with another canopy is a statistical hazard, and may be avoided by observing simple principles, including knowing upper wind speeds, the number of party members and exit groups, and having sufficient exit separation between jumpers. In 2013, 17% of all skydiving fatalities in the United States resulted from mid-air collisions.

Training 

Skydiving can be practised without jumping. Vertical wind tunnels are used to practise for free fall ("indoor skydiving" or "bodyflight"), while virtual reality parachute simulators are used to practise parachute control.

Beginning skydivers seeking training have the following options:

Static line
Instructor-assisted deployment (jumpmaster)
Accelerated free fall
Tandem skydiving

Parachute deployment 

At a sport skydiver's deployment altitude, the individual manually deploys a small pilot-chute which acts as a drogue, catching air and pulling out the main parachute or the main canopy. There are two principal systems in use: the "throw-out", where the skydiver pulls a toggle attached to the top of the pilot-chute stowed in a small pocket outside the main container: and the "pull-out", where the skydiver pulls a small pad attached to the pilot-chute which is stowed inside the container.

Throw-out pilot-chute pouches are usually positioned at the bottom of the container – the B.O.C. deployment system – but older harnesses often have leg-mounted pouches. The latter are safe for flat-flying, but often unsuitable for freestyle or head-down flying.

In a typical civilian sport parachute system, the pilot-chute is connected to a line known as the "bridle", which in turn is attached to a small deployment bag that contains the folded parachute and the canopy suspension lines, which are stowed with rubber bands. At the bottom of the container that holds the deployment bag is a closing loop which, during packing, is fed through the grommets of the four flaps that are used to close the container. At that point, a curved pin that is attached to the bridle is inserted through the closing loop. The next step involves folding the pilot-chute and placing it in a pouch (e.g., B.O.C pouch).

Activation begins when the pilot-chute is thrown out. It inflates and creates drag, pulling the pin out of the closing loop and allowing the pilot-chute to pull the deployment bag from the container. The parachute lines are pulled loose from the rubber bands and extend as the canopy starts to open. A rectangular piece of fabric called the "slider" (which separates the parachute lines into four main groups fed through grommets in the four respective corners of the slider) slows the opening of the parachute and works its way down until the canopy is fully open and the slider is just above the head of the skydiver. The slider slows and controls the deployment of the parachute. Without a slider, the parachute would inflate fast, potentially damaging the parachute fabric and/or suspension lines, as well as causing discomfort, injury or even death of the jumper.

If a skydiver experiences a malfunction of their main parachute which they cannot correct, they pull a "cut-away" handle on the front right-hand side of their harness (on the chest) which will release the main canopy from the harness/container. Once free from the malfunctioning main canopy, the reserve canopy can be activated manually by pulling a second handle on the front left harness. Some containers are fitted with a connecting line from the main to reserve parachutes – known as a reserve static line (RSL) – which pulls open the reserve container faster than a manual release could. Whichever method is used, a spring-loaded pilot-chute then extracts the reserve parachute from the upper half of the container.

Competitions

World Championships are held every two years both Indoor and Outdoor in the competition disciplines Artistic Events (Freestyle and Freefly, indoor and outdoor), Canopy Formation (outdoor only), Canopy Piloting (outdoor only), Dynamic (indoor only), Formation Skydiving (indoor and outdoor), Paraski (outdoor only), Style & Accuracy Landing (outdoor only) and Wingsuit Flying (outdoor only). Continental Championships and World Cups can be held in alternate years.

Artistic Events 
There are now two competitive Artistic Events, Freestyle and Freefly. Freestyle teams consist of a performer and a videographer, Freefly teams have two performers and a videographer. Skysurfing is no longer a competitive event after insufficient competitors entered in two successive World Championships. The history of these events is on this Freeflying page.

Accuracy Landing 

Often called "Classic accuracy", this is an individual or team contest performed under an open parachute. The aim is to touch down on a target whose center is 2 cm in diameter. The target can be a deep foam mattress or an air-filled landing pad. 
An electronic recording pad of 32 cm in diameter is set in the middle. It measures score in 1 cm increments up to 16 cm and displays result just after landing.

The first part of any competition takes place over 8 rounds. Then in the individual competition, after these 8 selective rounds, the top 25% jump a semi-final round. After the semi-final round, the top 50% are selected for the final round.
The competitor with the lowest cumulative score is declared the winner.

Competitors jump in teams of 5 maximum, exiting the aircraft at 1,000 or 1,200 meters and opening their parachutes sequentially to allow each competitor a clear approach to the target.

This sport is unpredictable because weather conditions play a very important part. So classic accuracy requires high adaptability to aerology and excellent steering control.

It is also the most interesting discipline for spectators due to the closeness of action (a few meters) and the possibility to be practiced everywhere (sport ground, stadium, urban place...).
Today, classic accuracy is the most practiced (in competition) discipline of skydiving in the world.

Canopy Formation
Previously called Canopy Relative Work, or CREW for short, is a skydive where the participants open their parachutes very quickly after leaving the aircraft with the intention of flying in close proximity to each other. The goal is to create various formations by "docking" with other parachutists on the jump. The dock is often accomplished by placing one's feet into the lines of another person's parachute. Formations require at least 2 people, but can have many more.

Due to the close proximity of the canopies, care has to be taken by all participants to ensure the safety of the jump. It is common for a CREW jumper to carry a hook knife to use in case they become entangled in another jumper's lines.

Formation skydiving

Formation Skydiving (FS) was born in California, USA during the 1960s. The first documented skydiving formation occurred over Arvin, California in March 1964 when Mitch Poteet, Don Henderson, Andy Keech and Lou Paproski successfully formed a 4-man star formation, photographed by Bob Buquor. This discipline was formerly referred to in the skydiving community as Relative Work, often abbreviated to RW, Relly or Rel.

Style

Style can be considered as the sprint of parachuting. This individual discipline is played in free fall. The idea is to take maximum speed and complete a pre-designated series of maneuvers as fast and cleanly as possible (speed can exceed ). Jumps are filmed using a ground-based camera (with an exceptional lens to record the performance).

Performance is timed (from the start of the manoeuvre until its completion) and then judged in public at the end of the jump.
Competition includes 4 qualifying rounds and a final for the top 8. 
Competitors jump from a height of 2200 m to 2500 m. They rush into an acceleration stage for 15 to 20 seconds and then run their series of manoeuvres benefiting to the maximum of the stored speed. Those series consist of Turns and Back-Loops to achieve in a pre-designated order. The incorrect performance of the manoeuvres gives rise to penalties that are added at run time.

The performance of the athlete is defined in seconds and hundredths of a second.
The competitor with the lowest cumulative time is declared the winner.

Notice the complete sequence is performed by leading international experts in just over 6 seconds, penalties included.

Tunnel flying

Using a vertical wind tunnel to simulate free fall has become a discipline of its own and is not only used for training but has its own competitions, teams, and figures.

Wingsuit flying

'Wingsuit flying' or 'wingsuiting' is the sport of flying through the air using a wingsuit, which adds surface area to the human body to enable a significant increase in lift. The common type of wingsuit creates an extra surface area with fabric between the legs and under the arms.

Other skydiving disciplines

Angle flying 
Angle flying was presented for the first time in 2000 at the World Freestyle Competitions, the European Espace Boogie, and the Eloy Freefly Festival.

The technique consists of flying diagonally with a determinate relation between angle and trajectory speed of the body, to obtain an air stream that allows for control of flight. The aim is to fly in formation at the same level and angle, and to be able to perform different aerial games, such as freestyle, three-dimensional flight formation with grip, or acrobatic free-flying.

Cross-country
A cross-country jump is a skydive where the participants open their parachutes immediately after jumping, with the intention of covering as much ground under canopy as possible. The usual distance from jump run to the drop zone can be as much as several miles.

There are two variations of a cross-country jump:

The more popular one is to plan the exit point upwind of the drop zone. A map and information about the wind direction and velocity at different altitudes are used to determine the exit point. This is usually set at a distance from where all the participants should be able to fly back to the drop zone.

The other variation is to jump out directly above the drop zone and fly downwind as far as possible. This increases the risks of the jump substantially, as the participants must be able to find a suitable landing area before they run out of altitude.

Two-way radios and cell-phones are often used to make sure everyone has landed safely, and, in case of a landing off the drop zone, to find out where the parachutist is so that ground crew can pick them up.

Night jumps
Parachuting is not always restricted to daytime hours; experienced skydivers sometimes perform night jumps. For safety reasons, this requires more equipment than a usual daytime jump and in most jurisdictions, it requires both an advanced skydiving license (at least a B-License in the U.S.) and a meeting with the local safety official covering who will be doing what on the load. A lit altimeter (preferably accompanied with an audible altimeter) is a must. Skydivers performing night jumps often take flashlights up with them so that they can check their canopies have properly deployed.

A chem-light(glowstick) is a good idea on a night jump.

Night jumpers should be made aware of the dark zone, when landing at night. Above  jumpers flying their canopy have a good view of the landing zone normally because of reflected ambient light/moon light. Once they get close to the ground, this ambient light source is lost, because of the low angle of reflection. The lower they get, the darker the ground looks. At about 100 feet and below it may seem that they are landing in a black hole. Suddenly it becomes very dark, and the jumper hits the ground soon after. This ground rush should be explained to, and anticipated by, the first-time night jumper. Recommendations should be made to the jumper to utilize a canopy that is larger than they typically use on a day jump and to attempt to schedule their first night jump as close to a full moon as possible to make it easier to see the ground.

In addition, in order to mitigate problems seeing the target, people on the ground often park their cars with their headlights on around the target circle facing toward the center.

While more dangerous than regular skydiving and more difficult to schedule, two night jumps are required by the USPA for a jumper to obtain their D (expert) license.

Pond swooping

Pond swooping is a form of competitive parachuting wherein canopy pilots attempt to touch down and glide across a small body of water, and onto the shore. Events provide lighthearted competition, rating accuracy, speed, distance and style. Points and peer approval are reduced when a participant "chows", or fails to reach shore and sinks into the water. Swoop ponds are not deep enough to drown in under ordinary circumstances, their main danger being from the concussive force of an incorrectly executed maneuver. In order to gain distance, swoopers increase their speed by executing a "hook turn", wherein both speed and difficulty increase with the angle of the turn. Hook turns are most commonly measured in increments of 90 degrees. As the angle of the turn increases, both horizontal and vertical speed are increased, such that a misjudgement of altitude or imprecise manipulation of the canopy's control structures (front risers, rear risers, and toggles) can lead to a high-speed impact with the pond or Earth. Prevention of injury is the main reason why a pond is used for swooping rather than a grass landing area.

Skysurfing

Space ball
This is when skydivers have a ball that weighs 455–590 grams and release it in free fall. The ball maintains the same fall rate as the skydivers. The skydivers can pass the ball around to each other whilst in free fall. At a predetermined altitude, the "ball master" will catch the ball and hold on to it to ensure it does not impact the ground. Space balls are prohibited at many drop zones, due to risk to persons and property on the ground in the event that the ball is not caught or dropped during/after deployment

Stuff jumps

Thanks to large unpopulated areas to jump over, 'stuff' jumps become possible. These jumps consist of skydivers leaving the aircraft with some object. Rubber raft jumps are popular; where the jumpers sit in a rubber raft. Cars, bicycles, motorcycles, vacuum cleaners, water tanks, and inflatable companions have also been thrown out the back of an aircraft. At a certain altitude, the jumpers break off from the object and deploy their parachutes, leaving it to smash into the ground at terminal velocity.

Swoop and chug
A tradition at many drop zones is the swoop and chug. As parachutists land from the last load of the day, other skydivers often hand the landing skydivers a beer that is customarily chugged in the landing area. This is sometimes timed as a friendly competition but is usually an informal, untimed, kick-off for the night's festivities.

Another example of this is "hit and rock", a variant of accuracy landing devised to let people of varying skill levels compete for fun. "Hit and rock" is originally from POPS (Parachutists Over Phorty Society). The object is to land as close as possible to the chair, remove the parachute harness, sprint to the chair, sit fully in the chair and rock back and forth at least one time. The contestant is timed from the moment that feet touch the ground until that first rock is completed. This event is considered a race.

Tracking
Tracking is where skydivers take a body position to achieve a high forward speed, allowing them to cover a great distance over the ground. Tracking is also used at the end of group jumps to achieve separation from other jumpers before parachute deployment. The tracking position involves sweeping the arms out to the side of the body and straightening the legs with the toes pointed. Arms can be positioned further back to drop altitude faster. This is how a skydiver adjusts his or her elevation to match other jumpers in the formation in order to "dock" smoothly.

Sit flying 
This form of skydiving involves the skydivers flying in a feet-to-Earth position. With less surface area being presented to the wind these skydivers can generate more free-fall speed.

Head down flying 
This form of skydiving involves the skydivers flying in a head to Earth position. Generally, the object is to fly together with other skydivers and perform maneuvers during the free fall, for the sheer enjoyment of it all.

Organizations
The Fédération Aéronautique Internationale (FAI), Parachuting Commission (IPC) conducts FAI's parachuting activities, in particular World Records and International Competitions. It sets globally recognised parachuting proficiency levels, international records requirements, international judging competencies and competition rules.

National parachuting associations exist in many countries, many affiliated with the FAI, to promote their sport. In most cases, national representative bodies, as well as local drop zone operators, require that participants carry certification attesting to their training their level of experience in the sport, and their proven competence. Anyone who cannot produce such bona-fides is treated as a student, requiring close supervision.

The sole organization in the United States is the United States Parachute Association (USPA), which issues licenses and ratings, governs skydiving, publishes Parachutist Magazine, and represents skydiving to government agencies. USPA publishes the Skydivers Information Manual (SIM) and many other resources. In Canada, the Canadian Sport Parachuting Association is the lead organization. In South Africa, the sport is managed by the Parachute Association of South Africa, in France by the French Parachuting Federation, and in the United Kingdom by the British Parachute Association. In Brazil, the Centro Nacional de Paraquedismo (CNP) sets in Boituva, where many records have been broken and where it is known for being the second-largest center in the world and the largest in the Southern Hemisphere.

Within the sport, associations promote safety, technical advances, training and certification, competition and other interests of their members. Outside their respective communities, they promote their sport to the public and often intercede with government regulators.

Competitions are organized at regional, national and international levels in most of these disciplines. Some of them offer amateur competition.

Many of the more photogenic/videogenic variants also enjoy sponsored events with prize money for the winners.

The majority of jumpers tend to be non-competitive, enjoying the opportunity to skydive with their friends on weekends and holidays. The atmosphere of their gatherings is relaxed, sociable and welcoming to newcomers. Skydiving events, called "boogies", are arranged at local, national and international scale each year, which attracting both young jumpers and their elders – Parachutists Over Phorty (POPs), Skydivers Over Sixty (SOS) and even older groups.

Drop zones

In parachuting, a drop zone or DZ is most technically the area above and around a location where a parachutist freefalls and expects to land. In common use, it often refers to the totality of a skydiving operation (a business). And the area wherein parachutists land will be referred to as the "landing area." The drop zone is usually situated beside a small airport, often sharing the facility with other general aviation activities. Drop zone staff may include the DZO (drop zone operator or owner), manifest, pilots, instructors, coaches, cameramen, packers, riggers and other general staff.

Equipment
A parachutist's equipment consists of at least three, usually four components, a container/harness system, a main canopy, a reserve canopy and frequently an automatic activation device (AAD) as well. Other items may include a helmet, goggles, jumpsuit, altimeter, and gloves. An increasing number of skydivers wear cameras, like GoPros, to record their skydives.

Costs in the sport are not trivial. The market is not large enough to permit the steady lowering of prices that is seen with some other equipment like computers. A new container/harness system can cost between US$1,500 and US$3,500, main canopies for the experienced parachutist can cost between $2,000 and US$3,600, reserve canopies cost between US$1,500 and US$2,500 and AADs US$1,000 cost. Higher performance and tandem parachutes cost significantly more, whilst large docile student parachutes often cost less.
 
Most parachuting equipment is ruggedly designed and is enjoyed by several owners before being retired. A rigger is trained to spot signs of damage or misuse. Riggers also keep track of industry product and safety bulletins, and can, therefore, determine if a piece of equipment is up-to-date and serviceable.

Traveling with a parachute 
When traveling by plane, parachutes' owners may not want to put their parachute in the baggage hold in order to avoid possible deterioration due to possible incorrect handling by airport operators. In such case, a resulting malfunction in a future use of the parachute could be dramatic.

However, almost all parachutes contain an automatic activation device, thus bringing a parachute to the plane's cabin might cause issues when going through airport security. AADs can contain either void or pyrotechnic load, and the rest of the parachute also consists of several very uncommon metallic parts and cables, all of which could trigger scanners of the security screening.

In order to justify the presence of "suspicious" content inside the parachute (explosive, vacuum, metal pieces, cables). Travelers are encouraged to announce that they are traveling with a parachute when they buy their airplane ticket, and to produce those documents when asked by the airport security's staff :

 The AAD's explanation card that shows and describes what is seen on X-rays monitors 
 Documents from a country, airplane company, or airport officials themselves, that denote the exclusion of such devices from the forbidden items 
 The parachute's constructor book detailing the anatomy of the whole bag. Similarly to the AAD's card, it can help showing the purpose of all what could raise awareness of the staff

National skydiving associations usually list on their websites a piece of advice concerning this matter.

Record free fall parachute jumps

In 1914, while doing demonstrations for the U.S. Army, a parachute pioneer named Tiny Broadwick deployed her chute manually, thus becoming the first person to jump free-fall.

Although later on jumpers would ascend higher altitudes, Andreev's record was set without the use of a drogue chute during the jump and therefore remains the longest genuine free fall record.

During the late 1950s, Captain Joseph Kittinger of the United States was assigned to the Aerospace Medical Research Laboratories at Wright-Patterson AFB in Dayton, Ohio. For Project Excelsior (meaning "ever upward", a name given to the project by Colonel John Stapp), as part of research into high altitude bailout, he made a series of three parachute jumps wearing a pressurized suit, from a helium balloon with an open gondola.

For that return jump Kittinger was awarded the A. Leo Stevens parachute medal.

Pressurization for his right glove malfunctioned during the ascent, and his right hand swelled to twice its normal size. He set records for highest balloon ascent, highest parachute jump, longest drogue-fall (4 min), and fastest speed by a human through the atmosphere.

The jumps were made in a "rocking-chair" position, descending on his back, rather than the usual arch familiar to skydivers, because he was wearing a  "kit" on his behind and his pressure suit naturally formed that shape when inflated, a shape appropriate for sitting in an airplane cockpit. For the series of jumps, Kittinger was decorated with an oak leaf cluster to his Distinguished Flying Cross and awarded the Harmon Trophy by President Dwight Eisenhower.

In 2012, the Red Bull Stratos mission took place. Kittinger was a member of the mission control and helped design the capsule and suit that Baumgartner ascended and jumped in.

On 24 October 2014, Alan Eustace broke the record previously set by Baumgartner for the highest fall.

Other records

Individual jumps
 Don Kellner holds the record for the most parachute jumps up to 2021, with a total of 46,355 jumps. He made his last eight skydives on May 1, 2021, in Hazleton, Pennsylvania, before his death from cancer on the following July 22, aged 85.
 In 1929, U.S. Army Sergeant R. W. Bottriell held the world's record for the most parachute jumps with 500. At that number, Bottriell stopped parachuting and became a ground instructor.
 Cheryl Stearns (U.S.) holds the record for the most parachute descents by a woman, with a total of 20,000 in August 2014, as well as the most parachute jumps made in a 24-hour period by a woman—352 jumps from 8–9 November 1995.
 Erin Hogan became the world's youngest sky diver as of 2002, when she tandem jumped at age 5. (Beaten in 2003 by age 4 Kiwi)
 Bill Dause holds the record for the most accumulated freefall time with over 420 hours (30,000+ jumps).
 Jay Stokes holds the record for most parachute descents in a single day at 640.
 The Oldest Female solo skydiver was Dilys Price. On 13 April 2013 she carried out the oldest solo parachute jump by a woman from Langar Airfield, Nottingham, UK when she was 80 years and 315 days.
 The Oldest Female tandem skydiver is Irene O'Shea. Her jump raised money and awareness for the Motor Neuron Disease Association of Southern Australia.
 The Oldest Male tandem skydiver, according to Guinness Book of World Records, is Bryson William Verdun Hayes (born 6 April 1916), who achieved the feat on 14 May 2017 at the age of 101 years 38 days. Bryson Hayes had earlier become the oldest ever UK sky diver, achieving the feat on 11 April 2016 when he was 100 years old.
The record was previously held by Armand Gendreau (born 24 June 1913) who made a tandem parachute jump above Notre-Dame-de-Lourdes, Québec, Canada, on 27 June 2014 at the age of 101 years 3 days
In July 2017, 102-year-old Kenneth Meyer (born 5 February 1915) became the oldest person to skydive. As of December 2018, his achievement is under review by Guinness World Records and Hayes continues to hold the Guinness Record for the oldest male tandem skydiver.
The Oldest Solo United States skydiver is Milburn Hart from Seattle, Washington. He was 96 years old when achieved this feat by making a solo jump in February 2005.
 On 14 October 2012, after seven years of planning, Felix Baumgartner (Austria) achieved the highest jump altitude, the highest freefall and the highest speed in freefall. He also became the first skydiver to break the sound barrier. He started from Roswell, New Mexico, USA.

Group jumps
 World's record for the most tandem parachute jumps in a 24-hour period is 403. This record was set at Skydive Hibaldstow on 10 July 2015, in memory of Stephen Sutton.
 World's largest formation in free-fall: 8 February 2006 in Udon Thani, Thailand (400 linked persons in freefall).
 World's largest head down formation (vertical formation): 31 July 2015 at Skydive Chicago in Ottawa, Illinois, U.S. (164 linked skydivers in head to Earth attitude):
 Largest female head down formation (vertical formation): 30 November 2013 at Skydive Arizona in Eloy, Arizona, U.S. (63 linked skydivers in head to Earth attitude).
 European record: 13 August 2010, Włocławek, Poland. Polish skydivers broke a record when 102 people created a formation in the air during the Big Way Camp Euro 2010. The skydive was their fifteenth attempt at breaking the record.
 World's largest canopy formation: 100, set on 21 November 2007 in Lake Wales, Florida, U.S.
 Largest wingsuit formation: 22 September 2012, Perris Valley, California, U.S. (100 wingsuit jumpers).
 Largest all-blind skydiving formation: 2, with Dan Rossi and John "BJ" Fleming on 13 September 2003.
 The oldest civilian parachute club in the world is The Irish Parachute Club, founded in 1956 by Freddie Bond and located in Clonbullogue, Co. Offaly, Ireland.
 The oldest civilian parachute club in the USA is The Peninsula Skydivers Skydiving Club, founded in 1962 by Hugh Bacon Bergeron, located in West Point, VA,
In September 1980, the World Record Night Dive was performed at Perris, California, USA, as the last night World Record before it was eliminated as a separate category by the Fédération Aéronautique Internationale. It has since been reinstated in 2017.

Popular culture
A song with various versions of its lyrics, one of which uses as its first line "He jumped without a parachute from twenty thousand feet", and includes the line "They scraped him off the tarmac like a lump of strawberry jam", has been used as a campfire song by Scouts. It is sung to the tune Battle Hymn of the Republic, also known as John Brown's Body. The cadence Blood on the Risers also goes to the same tune, also about parachuting in the military.

See also

 List of paratrooper forces
 Banzai skydiving
 Dolly Shepherd
 Parachute landing fall
 Paratrooper
 Space diving
 Speed skydiving
 Space Games
 The First School of Modern SkyFlying
 Skydiver day
 High-altitude military parachuting

References

External links

An in-depth look at skydiving - from the history of the sport through to modern advances
Unplanned Freefall? - a slightly tongue-in-cheek look at surviving free-fall without a parachute
Free fall accidents, mathematics of free fall - detailed research on the topic
Chuteless jump survivors
 Detailed account of origins and development of EXCELSIOR project.

 
Military sports
Air sports
Articles containing video clips
Falling